Erle Charles Reiter (December 29, 1916 in Minneapolis, MN – December 3, 2008 in Bloomington, MN) was an American figure skater.  He began skating as a seven-year-old.  He went on to become a three-time silver medalist at the U.S. Figure Skating Championships and competed at the 1936 Winter Olympics. He died in 2008 and is buried in Lakewood Cemetery in Minneapolis.

Results

References

 Sports-reference profile

1916 births
2008 deaths
American male single skaters
Olympic figure skaters of the United States
Figure skaters at the 1936 Winter Olympics